Sweden was represented at the Junior Eurovision Song Contest 2004 by the Limelights and the song "Varför jag?". the duo of Anna Jalkéus and Liselotte Östblom were the winners of the Lilla Melodifestivalen contest in 2004.

Before Junior Eurovision

Lilla Melodifestivalen 2004 
Lilla Melodifestivalen 2004 was used to select the artist to represent Sweden at the Junior Eurovision Song Contest 2004, organised by Swedish broadcaster Sveriges Television (SVT). More than 1400 entries were submitted to SVT to compete in the contest, with only 10 being selected to compete in the televised contest on 9 October 2004. 

The contest was hosted by children's TV presenter Mela Tesfazion and singer of Barbados and Alcazar Magnus Carlsson. The winner was decided by a jury and public televoting.

During the interval act, Lena Philipsson performed her new single "Lena Anthem".

At Junior Eurovision
On the night of the contest, held in Lillehammer in Norway, the Limelights performed 16th in the running order of the contest, following Spain and preceding Belgium. At the close of the voting "Varför jag" received 8 points, placing 15th of the 18 competing entries.

Voting

External links
Lilla Melodifestivalen 2004 Sveriges Television

References

Junior Eurovision Song Contest
Sweden
2004

es:Lilla Melodifestivalen 2004